Lawngtlai is the district headquarters of Lawngtlai district in the state of Mizoram in India. It is also the headquarters of Lai Autonomous District Council, one of the three autonomous district councils in Mizoram (the other two being Mara Autonomous District Council and Chakma Autonomous District Council).

History
Lawngtlai village was established by Haihmunga Hlawncheu, a Lai Chief, in 1880 at present Vengpui. It has been named "Lawngtlai" as one day the Chief Haihmunga Hlawncheu seized a boat that was drifting down Kaladan river hence the name Lawng-tlai, which means Lawng=boat, and tlai=seized.

Demographics 
According to Census of India, 2011 Lawngtlai town has population of 20,830 of which 10,659 are males while 10,171 are females. Population of Children with age of 0-6 is 3122 which is 14.99% of total population of Lawngtlai. In Lawngtlai Notified Town, Female Sex Ratio is of 954 against Mizoram state average of 976. Moreover Child Sex Ratio in Lawngtlai is around 971 compared to Mizoram state average of 970. Literacy rate of Lawngtlai city is 95.66% higher than state average of 91.33%. In Lawngtlai, Male literacy is around 96.97% while female literacy rate is 94.28%.

Communities 
Majority of the people belong to Lai group. They are small part of a much larger Chin people in Chin State, Burma. However, nowadays most Lais speak Mizo as their first language. Lais in India in general were earlier known as Pawis by outsiders.

Transport
A helicopter service by Pawan Hans has been started which connects  Aizawl with Lawngtlai. The distance between Lawngtlai and Aizawl through NH 54 is 296 km and is connected with regular service of bus and jeeps. The state government has proposed to extend the railway up to Lawngtlai. Lawngtlai is also going to be the nodal point in India for the Kaladan Multi-Modal Transit Transport Project which will link the town with Setpyitpyin (Kaletwa) in Myanmar through a 62 kilometre highway.

Education 
There is one college Lawngtlai College, under Mizoram University and a number of public and private schools.

Media 
The major newspapers in Lawngtlai are:
 Chhawkhlei Times
 Lai Aw
 Lai Ram
 The Lawngtlai Post
 Phawngpui Express
 Ram Eng

External links 
 Lawngtlai District website
 Website of its Southern neighbour

References

 
Cities and towns in Lawngtlai district